"Making Love in the Rain" is the third single by Herb Alpert from his Keep Your Eye on Me album. It features lead vocals by Lisa Keith with back-up vocals by Janet Jackson. It also features the rare occurrence of Alpert playing a muted trumpet, since he normally plays without one.

"Making Love in the Rain" was a big success on the U.S. Hot R&B/Hip-Hop Singles & Tracks chart, reaching number seven. In the 1987 US Billboard adult contemporary chart, the song is peaked at number 21. The song did moderately well on the Billboard Hot 100, peaking at number 35.

For the first time, Jackson included the song during the DJ interlude on the second leg of her 2018 State of the World Tour.

Charts

Official versions/remixes
 Album version – 5:53
 Instrumental – 5:49
 12" mix – 5:50
 7" edit – 3:58

Track listings
Canada/Japan/US/West Germany 7" single
"Making Love in the Rain" (Edit)
"Rocket to the Moon"

UK 7"
"Making Love in the Rain" (Edit)
"Making Love in the Rain" (Instrumental)

UK/West Germany 12"
"Making Love in the Rain" (12" Mix)
"Making Love in the Rain" (Instrumental)
"The Herb Alpert CD Megamix"

US 12"
"Making Love in the Rain" (12" Mix)
"Diamonds" (Cool Summer Mix)
"Keep Your Eye on Me" (Extended Mix)

Samples
Queen Latifah: "Just Another Day" from the album Black Reign
Bone Thugs-n-Harmony: "Days of Our Livez" from the album Singles
Styles P: "Ghost P" from the mixtape Ghost in the Machine
Stalley: "She Hates The Bass" from the mixtape Lincoln Way Heights
H.E.R.: "Damage"
Truth Inc.: "Bring Back The Days"

References

1987 singles
1987 songs
Janet Jackson songs
Songs written by Jimmy Jam and Terry Lewis
Song recordings produced by Jimmy Jam and Terry Lewis
Pop ballads
Contemporary R&B ballads
Smooth jazz songs
1980s ballads